Yadin B. Kaufmann (born July 31, 1959) is an Israeli-American technology investor, social entrepreneur and writer.

Kaufmann co-founded two venture capital firms: Veritas Venture Partners, an Israel-based fund investing in early-stage tech startups, and Sadara Ventures, the first venture capital fund to target Palestinian tech companies. He also founded two non-profit organizations: Tmura, an Israeli fund that connects the high-tech community to philanthropy in Israel, and the Palestinian Internship Program, which arranges work opportunities for young Palestinian professionals at Israel-based tech and finance companies.

In 2011, Israeli financial magazine, The Marker, named Kaufmann to its list of the 100 most influential people in the Israeli economy.

In 2017, Foreign Policy magazine named Kaufmann one of its “Global Thinkers”, a list of "the world's pre-eminent thought leaders and public intellectuals."

Since January 2019, Kaufmann has served as a member of the Board of Directors of the Anti-Defamation League.

Venture capital career

Venture Capital in Israel 
In 1987, Kaufmann joined Athena Venture Partners, Israel's first venture capital fund.

In 1990, Kaufmann co-founded Veritas Venture Partners, an early-stage investor in Israeli technology-based companies.

Athena and Veritas led seed-stage (and subsequent) financing rounds in Israeli companies including Mercury Interactive Corp. (Nasdaq: MERQ, later acquired by HP); Electronics for Imaging (Nasdaq: EFII), Gilat Satellite Networks (Nasdaq: GILT), Class Data Systems (acquired by Cisco), M-Systems (Nasdaq: MSYS, later acquired by SanDisk), ESC Medical Systems (Nasdaq: ESCMF, later acquired by Lumenis), and others.

Venture Capital in the Palestinian Territories 
In 2008, Kaufmann partnered with Palestinian tech entrepreneur Saed Nashef to build the first-ever venture capital fund to target Palestinian tech startups.  They raised a $30 million fund from investors including the Soros Economic Development Fund, AOL founder Steve Case's Case Foundation, former eBay President Jeff Skoll's Skoll Foundation, Google Foundation, Cisco and the European Investment Bank and launched it as "Sadara Ventures" in 2011.

Sadara Ventures made Palestine's first-ever VC investment in Yamsafer, an online accommodation booking platform, in 2012, and went on to invest in five more startups in the Palestinian Territories.

US President Barack Obama referred to Kaufmann and Nashef's partnership in his March 2013 speech in Jerusalem.

Kaufmann initiated an effort to provide financing from the US Government for Palestinian economic development, with a focus on Israeli-Palestinian cooperation; this helped lead to the Nita M. Lowey Middle East Partnership for Peace Act (MEPPA). In December 2020, the US Congress allocated $250M of funding over 5 years for MEPPA, which supports economic partnerships and people-to-people exchanges between Israelis and Palestinians. This was included in the Congressional spending bill, which President Trump signed into law. The MEPPA legislation establishes the Joint Investment for Peace Initiative, which is to provide funding for projects that contribute to the Palestinian private sector economy in the West Bank and Gaza, particularly small- and medium-sized enterprises owned by Palestinians. The program prioritizes projects that increase economic cooperation between Israelis and Palestinians. This investment program is based in part on a plan Kaufmann proposed in an article in Foreign Affairs in Summer 2017, and Kaufmann worked with several Congresspeople during drafting of the legislation.

Non-profit activity

Tmura - The Israeli Public Service Venture Fund 
In 2002, Kaufmann founded and he continues to serve as chairman of “Tmura - The Israeli Public Service Venture Fund.” Tmura receives donations of equity from Israeli and Israel-related high-tech companies and, upon a liquidity event such as an acquisition or initial public offering, allocates the proceeds to education- and youth-related charities in Israel.

As of June 2022, Tmura has received options donations from more than 800 companies and has raised over $28 million for the causes that it supports.

The Palestinian Internship Program 
In 2014, Kaufmann founded and he continues to serve as chairman of the Palestinian Internship Program (PIP), a US-registered non-profit that arranges work experiences and other professional development activities for highly talented Palestinian graduates from the West Bank and East Jerusalem in the Israeli high-tech sector.

As of June 2022, PIP has enabled more than 90 young Palestinian professionals to work at 50 Israel-based companies including Google, Intel, HP Indigo and Cisco, as well as a number of Israeli  startups and venture funds.

In 2020, PIP launched The Palestinian Mentorship Program (PMP), which connects Palestinian business leaders and entrepreneurs with experienced talent in Israel, the US, Europe, and the Gulf. As of June 2022, PMP has connected 58 Palestinian businesspeople with Mentors.

Breaking the Impasse 
Kaufmann is a member of Breaking the Impasse (BTI), a World Economic Forum (WEF)-backed advocacy group of Palestinian and Israeli businesspeople (founded by Palestinian businessman Munib al-Masri and Israeli high-tech entrepreneur Yossi Vardi) lobbying political leaders to advance the Israeli-Palestinian peace process.

Kaufmann has spoken on behalf of BTI at WEF-sponsored events including at the group's launch event at the Dead Sea, Jordan in 2013 and at Davos, Switzerland in 2014.

Writing and public speaking 
In 1978, Kaufmann and his then-girlfriend (now wife), Lori Banov Kaufmann wrote Summer ’79 in France. They then wrote The Boston Ice Cream Lover’s Guide, which was published by Addison-Wesley in 1985.

In 2004, Kaufmann co-founded (with Mark Bernstein) Hundreds of Heads Books to publish a series of books that help people through life’s biggest challenges, based on advice and entertaining experiences collected from hundreds of people across the US who have "been there, done that". Their best-selling book How to Survive Your Freshman Year is in its 6th edition.

Kaufmann has written op-ed articles about his professional activities, especially relating to the role Israel can play in promoting Palestinian private sector technology-related enterprise. In 2017, he wrote a feature article in Foreign Affairs entitled, “Start-Up Palestine: How to Spark a West Bank Tech Boom.” He has also published articles in the Times of Israel and Haaretz. When studying for a J.D. at Harvard Law School, Kaufmann was an editor of the Harvard Law Review.

He has spoken at forums including TEDx Rome, StartupGrind Ramallah, Seeds of Peace, American Israel Public Affairs Committee (AIPAC) and DLD Tel Aviv.

References 

Princeton University alumni
Harvard Law School alumni
Venture capitalists
Israeli Venture capitalists
Israeli businesspeople
Living people
1959 births
American company founders